Governor Ross may refer to:

Alexander Ross (civil servant) (1800–1889), Governor of Agra from 1835 to 1836
C. Ben Ross (1876–1946), 15th Governor of Idaho
Edmund G. Ross (1826–1907), 13th Governor of New Mexico Territory
Guillermo Ross (1695–1757), interim Governor of Buenos Aires in c. 1750
Lawrence Sullivan Ross (1838–1898), 19th Governor of Texas
Nellie Tayloe Ross (1876–1977), 14th Governor of Wyoming, wife of William B. Ross
William H. H. Ross (1814–1887), 37th Governor of Delaware
William B. Ross (1873–1924), 12th Governor of Wyoming